The International Esports Federation (IESF) is a global organisation based in South Korea whose mission it is to have esports recognized as a legitimate sport.

Member Nations 
So far, there are 130 member nations in IESF:

History

The International Esports Federation was founded on August 8, 2008, by nine esports associations from Denmark, South Korea, Germany, Austria, Belgium, The Netherlands, Switzerland, Vietnam and Taiwan, and held its first general meeting in November of the same year.

A year later, on December 12, the IeSF was able to host its own international tournaments, starting with the "IeSF challenge" in 2009, followed by "IeSF Grand Finals" in 2010, and the "IeSF World Championship" in 2011 and onward.

2012 saw a massive breakthrough for esports and the IeSF, as the IeSF 2012 World championship presented an esports tournament for women for the first time.

On July 7, 2013, IeSF was selected as counterpart for the electronic sports discipline of the 4th Asian Indoor and Martial Arts Games. This was a big breakthrough for esports and the IeSF, as the branch was introduced in an Olympic event for the first time.

In May 2013, IeSF was approved as the official signatory of the World Anti-Doping Agency in the branch of e-Sports.

In July 2013, IeSF submitted an application to join Sport Accord, and is expected to be approved as a temporary member in April 2014.

In November 2013, IeSF saw a successful overseas launch of its events, as the IeSF 2013 World Championship and the 2013 General Meeting was held in the city of Bucharest, Romania, in what was the first time of an IeSF event held outside of South Korea.

In May 2014, IeSF was approved for membership by TAFISA. The IeSF will be represented at the 2016 TAFISA World Games for All, to be held in Jakarta.

In 2014, IeSF restricted female players from participating in the Hearthstone tournament, as part of the World Championship division of tournament into male and female sections. IeSF later revised the policy, uniting the section into open-for-all tournaments while maintaining female-only tournaments with smaller prize pools.

In the 2015 World Championship, an esports panel was hosted with guests from international sports society to discuss the future recognition of esports as a recognized, legitimate sporting activity worldwide.

The four federations which are newly represented in the IESF are Colombia's Federación Colombiana de Deportes Electrónicos (FEDECOLDE), Kazakhstan's Qazaq Cybersport Federation (QCF), Turkey's Turkish Esports Federation (TESFED), and Ukraine's Federation of E-Sport of Ukraine (UESF).

The addition of four more countries brings the IESF's total count of member nations to 60, with six continents represented. Asia and Europe make up the bulk of the numbers with 24 and 22 respectively, with Macau's arrival in 2016 marking the last time a new member joined until now.

In July 2016, Macau became the 56th member nation of the IESF.

The International eSports Federation (IeSF) has voted to accept the United States eSports Federation (USeF) as a full member. The decision, taken at the IeSF General Meeting in Kaohsiung in Taiwan, means that USeF is the official recognized national governing body of esports in the US.

Esports is set to expand across the Middle East with Korean non-profit International Esports Federation (IESF) recently announcing plans to enter the region. IESF has signed a memorandum of understanding (MoU) with the UAE's Motivate Media Group, parent company of Gulf Business, to expand regionally. Currently, the Esports category has over 300 million gamers across the Middle East alone.

World Esports Championships 

So far, the IESF has held fourteen World Esports Championships:

References

External links

 
International sports organizations
Esports governing bodies
Sports organizations established in 2008
2008 establishments in South Korea
Esports in South Korea